Luigi Cimara (19 July 1891 – 26 January 1962) was an Italian film actor. He appeared in 46 films between 1914 and 1960. He was born and died in Rome, Italy.

Partial filmography

 L'esplosione del forte B.2 (1914)
 Cura di baci (1916)
 La macchia rossa (1916)
 Lotta d'elementi, raffiche d'anime (1917)
 Caino (1918) - Raoul Leveson
 L'autunno dell'amore (1918)
 Passion tzigane (1918)
 ...E dopo? (1918)
 L'onore della famiglia (1919)
 La colpa vendica la colpa (1919)
 Elevazione (1920)
 La rupe tarpea (1920) - Tonio
 La lotta per la vita (1921)
 The Telephone Operator (1932) - Il direttore del telefoni
 Loyalty of Love (1934) - Il principe de Metternich
 Unripe Fruit (1934) - Edoardo Manni
 The Joker King (1936) - Il conte Di Verolengo
 The Last Days of Pompeo (1937) - L'avvocato
 Destiny (1938)
 La Damigella di Bard (1938) - Il marchese Luciano di Pombia
 Belle o brutte si sposan tutte... (1939)
 Il piccolo re (1939)
 L'aria del continente (1939) - Peppino Patrone
 Dora Nelson (1939) - Alberto, il primo marito
 Wealth Without a Future (1940)
 Validità giorni dieci (1940) - Il conte Matropulous
 Il signore della taverna (1940)
 First Love (1941) - Il maestro Giacomo Asquini
 Honeymoon (1941) - Valerio, zio di Mario
 Redenzione (1943)
 L'amico delle donne (1943) - Il conte De Ryon
 Sant'Elena, piccola isola (1943) - Il maresciallo Bertrand
 Anything for a Song (1943)
 Il fiore sotto gli occhi (1944) - Il commendator Sanna, editore
 Adam and Eve (1949) - Ulisse
 Without a Flag (1951)
 Gli uomini non guardano il cielo (1952)
 In Olden Days (1952) - Il signore nell'auto scoperta (segment "Il carrettino dei libri vecchi")
 Five Paupers in an Automobile (1952) - L'investito
 The Enemy (1952) - Lord John Lumb
 Carne inquieta (1952) - Duca di Moliterno
 Lulu (1953) - Farnesi
 100 Years of Love (1954) - Count Ubaldo di Lucoli (segment "Pendolin")
 The Boatman of Amalfi (1954) - Sir White - the consul
 Captain Falcon (1958) - Eremit
 A Breath of Scandal (1960)

References

External links

1891 births
1962 deaths
Italian male film actors
Italian male silent film actors
Male actors from Rome
20th-century Italian male actors